George Benham Seligman (born April 30, 1927) is an American mathematician who works on Lie algebras, especially semi-simple Lie algebras.

Biography
Seligman received his bachelor's degree in 1950 from the University of Rochester and his PhD in 1954 from Yale University under Nathan Jacobson with thesis Lie algebras of prime characteristic. After he received his PhD he was a Henry Burchard Fine Instructor at Princeton University from 1954–1956. In 1956 he became an instructor and from 1965 a full professor at Yale, where he was chair of the mathematics department from 1974 to 1977.

For the academic year 1958/59 he was a Fulbright Lecturer at the University of Münster. His doctoral students include James E. Humphreys and Daniel K. Nakano.

Since 1959 he has been married to Irene Schwieder and the couple has two daughters.

Selected works

Books
On Lie algebras of prime characteristic, American Mathematical Society, 1956
Liesche Algebren, Schriftenreihe des Mathematischen Instituts der Universität Münster, 1959
Modular Lie Algebras, Springer Verlag 1967
Rational methods in Lie algebras, Marcel Dekker 1976
Rational constructions of modules for simple Lie algebras, American Mathematical Society 1981
Construction of Lie Algebras and their Modules, Springer Verlag 1988

Articles

References

1927 births
Possibly living people
20th-century American mathematicians
21st-century American mathematicians
Algebraists
University of Rochester alumni
Yale University alumni
Yale University faculty
Mathematicians from New York (state)
Princeton University fellows